Nitinat River is a river on the west coast of Vancouver Island in the Canadian province of British Columbia. Its source is in the Vancouver Island Ranges at McKinlay Peak. It travels in a south-west direction from its source until it meets Nitinat Lake at the Pacific Ocean.

Along the river's course there is a provincial park called Nitinat River Provincial Park and a fish hatchery called Nitinat Hatchery.

See also
List of rivers in British Columbia

References

External links

Rivers of Vancouver Island
Mid Vancouver Island
Rivers of British Columbia